Big Block Singsong is a Canadian children's animated musical group created by Warren Brown and Adam Goddard. They are best known for their regular series of animated music videos which have aired as interstitial programming on channels such as Disney Junior in the United States, Nick Jr. in the UK,  ABC Kids in Australia and CBC Kids in Canada since 2012 and as the winners of the Juno Award for Children's Album of the Year at the Juno Awards of 2020 for their album Greatest Hits, Vol. 4. It is directed, designed, and animated by Brown and composed and sung by Goddard.

They received two previous Juno Award nominations at the Juno Awards of 2016 for Greatest Hits and at the Juno Awards of 2018 for Greatest Hits, Vol. 3.

The duo has also produced songs about letters and numbers for TVO Kids under the name ABC Singsong, under which they received two more Juno nominations at the Juno Awards of 2021 for Letters and Numbers and at the Juno Awards of 2022 for Words Words Words.

Plot 
Each episode features a different block shaped character, based on a real life thing, (e.g. an animal, a person, or even a concept or idea) singing a song, either about themselves, or what they do. They sing original songs in many different musical genres.

Episodes 
In total, the show ran for 4 series with 89 episodes.

Series 1 (2012)

Series 2 (2013)

Series 3 (2014-2015)

Series 4 (2016-2017)

References

Canadian children's musical groups
Juno Award for Children's Album of the Year winners
CBC Television original programming